The 1969 New South Wales Open was a combined men's and women's tennis tournament played on grass courts at the White City Stadium in Sydney, Australia. The tournament was held from 13 January through 19 January 1969. It was the 77th edition of the event and the first one in the Open era of tennis. The singles titles were won by Margaret Court and fourth-seeded Tony Roche. It was Roche's second singles title after 1967 and he won AUS$3,594 first-prize money. Court earned AUS$1,537 for her singles win which was her sixth singles title at the tournament.

Finals

Men's singles
 Tony Roche defeated  Rod Laver 6–4, 4–6, 9–7, 12–10

Women's singles

 Margaret Court defeated  Rosemary Casals 6–1, 6–2

Men's doubles
 Rod Laver /  Roy Emerson defeated  John Newcombe /  Tony Roche 10–12, 6–4, 6–3

Women's doubles
 Margaret Court /  Judy Tegart defeated  Rosie Casals /  Billie Jean King 15–13, 1–6, 6–3

References

External links
 Official website
 Association of Tennis Professionals (ATP) tournament profile
 Women's Tennis Association (WTA) tournament profile

Sydney International
New South Wales Open
New South Wales Open
New South Wales Open, 1969